"The Crystal Lake" is a song by American indie rock band Grandaddy from their second album, The Sophtware Slump. It was released as a single on 29 May 2000 by record label V2, and was re-released in several formats in early 2001.

Content 

Grandaddy frontman Jason Lytle described the song as "that age-old story, repeated many times in country music, of the wayward soul who leaves a small town with hopes and dreams of the unknown and winds up full of regret in some horrible little apartment in an unfriendly city".

Release and reception 

"The Crystal Lake" was released as a single on 29 May 2000. It peaked at number 78 on the UK Singles Chart when first released and number 38 when re-issued in 2001.

The song was listed as the 295th best song of the 2000s by Pitchfork.

Track listings

 2000 release

CD

 7"

2001 releases

CD1

CD2

7"

References

External links 

  (original release)
  (2001 re-release)
 

2000 singles
Grandaddy songs
2000 songs
V2 Records singles